In social choice and operations research, the utilitarian rule (also called the max-sum rule) is a rule saying that, among all possible alternatives, society should pick the alternative which maximizes the sum of the utilities of all individuals in society. It is a formal mathematical representation of the utilitarian philosophy.

Definition 
Let  be a set of possible `states of the world' or `alternatives'. For example, in a single-winner election,  may represent the set of candidates; in a resource allocation setting,  may represent all possible allocations of the resource.

Let  be a finite set, representing a collection of individuals.  For each , let  be a utility function, describing the amount of happiness an individual i derives from each possible state.

The utilitarian rule selects an element  which maximizes the utilitarian sum

Tangible utility functions 
The utilitarian rule is easy to interpret and implement when the functions ui represent some tangible, measurable form of utility. For example:

 Consider a problem of allocating wood among builders. The utility functions may represent their productive power –  is the number of buildings that agent  can build using  units of wood. The utilitarian rule then allocates the wood in a way that maximizes the number of buildings.
 Consider a problem of allocating a rare medication among patient. The utility functions may represent their chance of recovery –  is the probability of agent  to recover by getting  doses of the medication. The utilitarian rule then allocates the medication in a way that maximizes the expected number of survivors.

Abstract utility functions 
When the functions ui represent some abstract form of "happiness", the utilitarian rule becomes harder to interpret. For the above formula to make sense, it must be assumed that the utility functions  are both cardinal and interpersonally comparable at a cardinal level.

The notion that individuals have cardinal utility functions is not that problematic. Cardinal utility has been implicitly assumed in decision theory ever since Daniel Bernoulli's analysis of the Saint Petersburg Paradox. Rigorous mathematical theories of cardinal utility (with application to risky decision making) were developed by Frank P. Ramsey, Bruno de Finetti, von Neumann and Morgenstern, and Leonard Savage. However, in these theories, a person's utility function is only well-defined up to an `affine rescaling'.

 

Thus, in a sense, classic utilitarian social choice is not well-defined within the standard model of cardinal utility used in decision theory, unless a mechanism is specified to `calibrate' the utility functions of the different individuals.

Relative utilitarianism 
Relative utilitarianism proposes a natural calibration mechanism.  For every , suppose that the values

 

are well-defined. Then define

 

for all . Thus,  is a `rescaled' utility function which has a minimum value of 0 and a maximum value of 1.

 

As an abstract social choice function, relative utilitarianism has been analyzed by Cao (1982), Dhillon (1998), Karni (1998), Dhillon and Mertens (1999), Segal (2000), Sobel (2001) and Pivato (2008). (Cao (1982) refers to it as the `modified Thomson solution'.)

The utilitarian rule and Pareto-efficiency 
Every Pareto efficient choice is necessarily utilitarian. This is because every Pareto improvement necessarily increases the sum of utilities. But the utilitarian choice is not the only Pareto-efficient one. In fact, every weighted utilitarian choice (maximizing a weighted sum of utilities) is Pareto-optimal, whenever the weights of all individuals are positive.

The utilitarian rule in specific contexts 
In the context of voting, the utilitarian rule leads to several voting methods:

 Range voting (also called score voting or utilitarian voting) implements the relative-utilitarian rule by letting voters explicitly express their utilities to each alternative on a common normalized scale.
 Implicit utilitarian voting tries to approximate the utilitarian rule while letting the voters express only ordinal rankings over candidates.
A related voting rule is Nanson's method.
In the context of resource allocation, the utilitarian rule leads to:

 A particular rule for division of a single homogeneous resource;
 Several rules and algorithms for utilitarian cake-cutting – dividing a heterogeneous resource;
A particular rule for fair item allocation.
Welfare maximization problem.

See also 

 Egalitarian rule – a different rule, that emphasizes the welfare of the worst-off individual rather than the sum of utilities.
Proportional-fair rule – a rule that tries to balance the efficiency of the utilitarian rule and the fairness of the egalitarian rule.
Utility maximization problem – a problem solved by an individual consumer (rather than by society).

References 

Voting theory
Utilitarianism
Mathematical optimization

de:Sozialwahltheorie
it:Teoria della scelta sociale
ja:社会選択理論
pt:Teoria da escolha social